Associação Atlética Francana, or simply Francana, is a Brazilian football team based in Franca, São Paulo. Founded in 1912, it plays in Campeonato Paulista Segunda Divisão.

The club competed in the Série A and in the Série C once.

History
The club was founded on October 12, 1912. They won the Campeonato Paulista Série A2 in 1977. Francana competed in the Série A in 1979, but were eliminated in the Second Stage. The club reached the final stage of the 1997 Série C, finishing in the third place out of four in that stage.

Achievements

 Campeonato Paulista Série A2:
 Winners (1): 1977

Stadium
Associação Atlética Francana play their home games at Estádio José Lancha Filho, nicknamed Lanchão. The stadium has a maximum capacity of 15,100 people.

References

 
Association football clubs established in 1912
Football clubs in São Paulo (state)
1912 establishments in Brazil